Anepsiomyia is a genus of flies in the family Dolichopodidae. It contains only one extant species from Europe, A. flaviventris, as well as two fossil species from the Eocene of Russia and Belarus. The systematic position of the genus is currently uncertain: it has been variously placed in subfamilies such as Sympycninae and Peloropeodinae.

The genus was originally known as Anepsius, named by Hermann Loew in 1857. Later, Mario Bezzi found it to be preoccupied by the beetle genus Anepsius (LeConte, 1851), and renamed it to Anepsiomyia in 1902.

Species
†Anepsiomyia atterraneus Nazaraw, 1994
Anepsiomyia flaviventris (Meigen, 1824)
†Anepsiomyia planipedia (Meunier, 1907) (Synonym: †A. planipedius (Meunier, 1907), a nomen nudum)

References

Dolichopodidae genera
Peloropeodinae
Taxa named by Mario Bezzi
Diptera of Europe